Jovanny David Bolívar Alvarado (born 16 December 2001) is a Venezuelan footballer who plays as a forward for Spanish club Albacete Balompié.

Club career 
On 9 March 2021, Bolívar joined D.C. United on a one-year loan with an option for a permanent transfer. He was later loaned again to D.C. United's reserve team, Loudoun United. Bolívar scored his first goal for Loudoun on 29 May 2021, securing a 1–0 win over New Mexico United.

On 11 January 2023, Bolívar signed a five-and-a-half-year contract with Spanish Segunda División side Albacete Balompié.

Career statistics

Club

Notes

References

2001 births
Living people
Venezuelan footballers
Association football forwards
Deportivo La Guaira players
D.C. United players
Venezuelan expatriate footballers
Expatriate soccer players in the United States
Loudoun United FC players
USL Championship players
People from Acarigua
21st-century Venezuelan people
Albacete Balompié players
Venezuelan expatriate sportspeople in Spain
Expatriate footballers in Spain